Tianmimi may refer to:

"Tian Mi Mi", 1979 song by Teresa Teng
Comrades: Almost a Love Story, or Tianmimi, 1996 Hong Kong film